This is a list of fossiliferous stratigraphic units in Cameroon.



See also 
 Lists of fossiliferous stratigraphic units in Africa
 List of fossiliferous stratigraphic units in Gabon
 Geology of Cameroon

References

Further reading 
 J. D. Congleton. 1990. Vertebrate Paleontology of the Koum Basin, Northern Cameroon, and Archosaurian Paleobiogeography in the Early Cretaceous. Department of Geology, Southern Methodist University, Dallas xv-245
 L. J. Flynn and M. Brunet. 1989. Early Cretaceous vertebrates from Cameroon. Journal of Vertebrate Paleontology 9(3, suppl.):21A
 L. J. Flynn, A. Brillanceau, M. Brunet, Y. Coppens, J. Dejax, M. Duperon-Laudoueneix, G. Ekodeck, K. M. Flanagan, E. Heintz, J. Hell, L. L. Jacobs, D. R. Pilbeam, S. Sen and S. Djallo. 1987. Vertebrate fossils from Cameroon, West Africa. Journal of Vertebrate Paleontology 7(4):469-471
 L. L. Jacobs, K. M. Flanagan, J. Dejax and M. Brunet. 1986. Dinosaur footprints from the Lower Cretaceous of Cameroun, west Africa. In D. D. Gillette and M. G. Lockley (eds.), First International Symposium on Dinosaur Tracks and Traces, Abstracts with Program 16
 S. Kiel and K. Bandel. 1999. The Pugnellidae, a new stromboidean family (Gastropoda) from the Upper Cretaceous. Paläontologische Zeitschrift 73(1/2):47-58
 M. J. Ntamak-Nida, B. Ketchemen-Tandia, R. V. Ewane, J. P. Lissock, and P. Courville. 2006. Nouvelles données sur les Mollusques et autres macro-organismes campaniens de Sikoum (Centre-Est du sous bassin de Douala-Cameroun): intérêts bio-chronologiques et paléo-écologiques. Africa Geoscience Review 13(4):385-394
 R. A. Reyment. 1955. The Cretaceous Ammonoidea of southern Nigeria and the southern Cameroons. Geological Survey of Nigeria Bulletin 25:1-112

Cameroon
 
 
Cameroon geography-related lists
Fossil